Shannon H Smallwood is the chief justice of the Supreme Court of the Northwest Territories, joining in 2012. She is a member of the Dene First Nations group. On September 23, 2022, Prime Minister Justin Trudeau appointed Smallwood as chief justice effective September 22, 2022.

References 

Living people
Dene people
Judges in the Northwest Territories
Year of birth missing (living people)